The Salghurids, also known as the Atabegs of Fars, were a Persianate dynasty of Salur Turkmen origin that ruled Fars, first as vassals of the Seljuqs then for the Khwarazm Shahs in the 13th century.

History 
The Salghurids were established by Sunqur in 1148, who had profited from the rebellions during the reign of Seljuq sultan Mas'ud ibn Muhammad. Later the Salghurids were able to solidify their position in southern Persia to the point of campaigning against Kurds and involving themselves in the succession of the Kirman Seljuqs, holding Seljuq sultan Malik-Shah III's son Mahmud as a possible claimant to the Seljuq throne. They briefly occupied Isfahan in 1203-4, and later occupied Bahrain taken from the Uyunid dynasty in 1235.

Under Sa'd I ibn Zangi, the Salghurids experienced a significant prosperity, which was marred by his acknowledging the Khwarazm Shahs as his overlord. Saadi Shirazi, the Persian poet, dedicated his Bostan and Gulistan to Sa'd I and Sa'd II. Following Sa'd I's death, his brother Zangi ibn Mawdud took power in 1161. Tekele followed his father, Zangi, only after eliminating Sonqur's son Toghril.

During the closing years of Abu Bakr ibn Sa'd and Sa'd II, Fars fell under the dominion of Mongol empire and later the Ilkhanate of Hulegu. Under the Mongols, Abu Bakr was given the title of Qutlugh Khan. Later Salghurids were powerless figureheads, until the daughter of Sa'd II, Abish Khatun was given the title of Atabegate of Fars. She was the sole ruler of Fars for one year whereupon she married, Mengu Temur, eleventh son of Hulegu. Following their deaths, Fars was ruled directly by the Ilkhanate.

Culture 
During the 13th century, the Salghurids patronized a cultural and intellectual atmosphere which included, Qadi Baydawi, Qutb al-Din al-Shirazi, Saadi Shirazi and the historian Wassaf. The Salghurids knowingly promoted themselves as an Iranian and Islamic dynasty, partly through their links to the ruins of the pre-Islamic Achaemenid Empire (550–330 BC). Under them, Shiraz became a hub for Persian culture.

List of Atabegs
 Sunqur ibn Mawdud (1148–1161)
 Zangi ibn Mawdud (1161–1178)
 Tekele ibn Zangi (1178–1198)
 Sa'd I ibn Zangi (1198–1226)
 Abu Bakr ibn Sa'd (1226–1260)
 Sa'd II (1260–1260)
 Muhammad I ibn Sa'd (1260–1262)
 Muhammad II ibn Salghur (1263)
 Saljuk Shah ibn Salghur (1263)
 Abish Khatun (1263–1282)

References

Sources 
 
 
 
 
 
 
 
 
 
 
 
 
 

Turkic dynasties
History of Fars Province
12th century in Iran
13th century in Iran
Atabegs
Salur tribe